The men's 10,000 metres event at the 1990 Commonwealth Games was held on 27 January at the Mount Smart Stadium in Auckland.

Results

References

10000
1990